Drinker is a surname. Notable people with the surname include:

 Elizabeth Sandwith Drinker (ca. 1735-1807), 18th-entury Quaker diarist
 Edith May (pseudonym of Anne Drinker; 1827–1903), American poet
 Edward Drinker Cope (1840-1897), American paleontologist and comparative anatomist
 Henry Sturgis Drinker (1850-1937), President of Lehigh University f
 Catherine Ann Drinker (1841–1922), American artist and author
 Henry Sandwith Drinker (1880-1965), American lawyer and musicologist
 Sophie Drinker (1888–1967), American amateur musician and musicologist
 Philip Drinker (1894-1972), industrial hygienist who invented the first iron lung
 Cecil Kent Drinker (1887-1956), American physician and founder of the Harvard School of Public Health
 Katherine Rotan Drinker (1889-1956), physician, 
 Catherine Drinker Bowen, born Catherine Drinker (1897-1973), American biographer
 Ernesta Drinker Ballard, born Ernesta Drinker (1920-2005), American feminist and horticulturist